Arshad Vohra (born July 17, 1958) was the vice Chairman of Pak Sarzameen Party. He is a former deputy mayor of Karachi and ex parliamentarian of Sindh. He is a professional engineer with a doctorate and a businessman.

Personal life 
Vohra was born on 17 July 1958 in Karachi, Pakistan, to a Urdu-speaking Gujarati Sunni Vohra family.

Arshad was elected twice as the chairman of SITE Association, in 2001–02 and 2012–13. He also served as the chairman of All-Pakistan Textile Mills Association (APTMA) in 2005–2006.

Political career

Provincial Assembly of Sindh 
He was elected Member Provincial Assembly of Sindh in May 2013, he resigned from his post after he was nominated deputy mayor of Karachi from MQM.

Deputy mayor of Karachi 
He was elected deputy mayor of Karachi on August 24, 2016. He took oath in his office on August 30, 2016

Departure from MQM and joining PSP 
In October 2017, Arshad Vohra left Muttahida Qaumi Movement and joined Pak Sarzameen Party. He told in a press conference, with Anis Kaimkhani, that MQM-P had no vision which was a major reason why he left MQM.

See also 
 Mayor of Karachi

References 

Living people
Pakistani people of Gujarati descent
Sindh MPAs 2013–2018
Mayors of Karachi
1958 births
Pak Sarzameen Party members